Holocola chlidana is a species of moth of the family Tortricidae. It is found in Australia, where it has been recorded from Tasmania. The habitat consists of wet forests.

The wingspan is about 16.5 mm.

References

Moths described in 1927
Eucosmini